William Johnson (January 19, 1901 – May 27, 1928) was an American wrestler. He competed in the freestyle welterweight event at the 1924 Summer Olympics.

References

1901 births
1928 deaths
Olympic wrestlers of the United States
Wrestlers at the 1924 Summer Olympics
American male sport wrestlers
People from Brownwood, Texas
Sportspeople from Texas